Eladio Vélez was a Colombian painter, was born in Itagüí, Antioquia in 1897 and died in Medellin, Antioquia in 1967. He is considered one of the most representative artists in the city of Itagüí and in Colombia.

His works embrace a theme sometimes considered inconsequential: rural landscapes, city streets, daily life, in which displays realistic technique that values color, plasticity and careful brushstrokes in the oil and the watercolor technique with which he founded with his friend Pedro Nel Gómez, the Antioquia Art School.

References

External links
Art Fact Professions: Painter Itagüí City. Web, Sep. 8, 2008.

People from Itagüí
1897 births
1967 deaths
20th-century Colombian painters
20th-century Colombian male artists
Colombian male painters